Frances Raines (born July 17, 1962) is an American actress who appeared in a number of horror and exploitation films throughout the 1980s, most notably Buddy Cooper's The Mutilator as Linda, and three directed by Tim Kincaid. Raines is also the niece of Claude Raines, of Casablanca and The Invisible Man fame.

Filmography

References

External links

American film actresses
1962 births
Living people
20th-century American actresses
21st-century American women